State law refers to the law of a federated state, as distinguished from the law of the federation of which it is a part.  It is used when the constituent components of a federation are themselves called states. Federations made up of provinces, cantons, or other units use analogous terms like provincial law or cantonal law.

State law may refer to: 

State law (Australia)
State law (Brazil)
State law (Germany)
State law (India)
State law (Mexico)
State law (Nigeria)
State law (United States)
State law (Venezuela)